Zhang Tielin (born 15 June 1957) is a British actor and film director. He is best known for portraying the Qianlong Emperor in the first two seasons of the Chinese television series My Fair Princess.

Early life and education
Zhang was born in Tangshan, China and grew up in Weinan. In 1973, he was sent to Lintong District, Xi'an to perform agricultural labour as part of the Chinese government's Down to the Countryside Movement. Three years later, he became a construction worker in Xi'an.

In 1978, Zhang enrolled in the Beijing Film Academy and graduated in 1982, after which he worked in the television station Tianjin Television. In 1984, Zhang made his debut in the films The Burning of Imperial Palace, Reign Behind a Curtain and Under the Bridge, of which the third one propelled him to fame.

Career
In 1987, Zhang went to England to further his studies at the British Film Institute and he graduated in 1990. He became a British citizen in 1997. In the early 1990s, Zhang went to Hong Kong to expand his career and signed a contract with film producer Tsui Hark, working together with Tsui on the Once Upon a Time in China film series. He joined the Hong Kong television network Phoenix Television in 1996 and worked there briefly before returning to the Chinese entertainment industry. His portrayal of the Qianlong Emperor in the first two seasons of the television series My Fair Princess boosted his fame. Zhang starred together with actors Wang Gang and Zhang Guoli in many television series and they are collectively known as the "Iron Triangle" in the Chinese entertainment industry.

In 2007, Zhang became the dean of the art school of Jinan University in Guangzhou.

Filmography

Film

Television

References

External links
 

1957 births
Living people
Male actors from Hebei
Chinese male film actors
Chinese male television actors
20th-century Chinese male actors
21st-century Chinese male actors
People who lost Chinese citizenship
Naturalised citizens of the United Kingdom
British male actors of Chinese descent
People from Tangshan
People's Republic of China Tibetan Buddhists
Tibetan Buddhists from the United Kingdom
Academic staff of Jinan University
Educators from Hebei
Jinan University alumni
Qianlong Emperor
The Amazing Race contestants